Ask Me No Questions may refer to:

 "Miss Susie had a steamboat", an schoolyard rhyme
 "Miss Lucy had a baby", a related schoolyard rhyme
 Ask Me No Questions (novel), a novel about Bangladeshi families in the United States
 "Ask Me No Questions" (Frasier), an episode of the television show Frasier